Nilam Sanjeep Xess (born 7 November 1998) is an Indian field hockey player who plays as a defender. He made his international debut for the national senior team at the 2016 South Asian Games. He captained India at the 2016 Boys Under-18 Asia Cup.

References

External links
Nilam Sanjeep Xess at Hockey India

1998 births
Living people
Indian male field hockey players
Field hockey players from Odisha
People from Sundergarh district
South Asian Games silver medalists for India
South Asian Games medalists in field hockey
2023 Men's FIH Hockey World Cup players